The RN-7 National Highway connects from Ali Sabieh to Assamo, and is  long.

References

Roads in Djibouti